Jangsu County (Jangsu-gun) is a county in North Jeolla Province, South Korea. It is well known for Jangsu-Galbi.

Climate

Twin towns – sister cities
Jangsu is twinned with:

  Anyang, South Korea (1996)
  Hapcheon, South Korea (1999)
  Jinhae-gu, South Korea (1999)

References

External links
 County government home page (in English)
 County government home page (in Korean)

 
Counties of North Jeolla Province